is a Japanese former sports shooter. He competed in the 300 metre rifle event at the 1964 Summer Olympics.

References

1939 births
Living people
Japanese male sport shooters
Olympic shooters of Japan
Shooters at the 1964 Summer Olympics
Place of birth missing (living people)